Daniel Altmaier was the defending champion but lost in the quarterfinals to Yuta Shimizu.

Benoît Paire won the title after defeating Shimizu 3–6, 6–0, 6–2 in the final.

Seeds

Draw

Finals

Top half

Bottom half

References

External links
Main draw
Qualifying draw

Puerto Vallarta Open - 1